Avatar is the third album by Swedish metal band Avatar, released on 20 November 2009. It is the last album to feature the guitarist Simon Andersson before he left the band in December 2011.

Track listing

Charts

References 

2009 albums
Avatar (Swedish band) albums